Aubrey Neville McDonald (born 3 February 1988 in Port Elizabeth, South Africa) is a South African rugby union player, currently playing with club side Rustenburg Impala. He is a utility back that can play as a fullback, winger or centre.

Career

Youth

His first taste of provincial rugby came in 2005, when he was selected in the Eastern Province side that reached the final of the Under-18 Craven Week competition in 2005. Despite being beaten 38–15 in the unofficial final against their  counterparts, McDonald's performances led to his inclusion in the 2005 South African Schools side. He scored two tries for them as they beat France 52–13 and scored another two tries as the South African Schools team lost 30–24 to a South African Academy team. He also represented the  side in the 2005 Under-19 Provincial Championship.

In 2006, McDonald moved to Pretoria, finishing his schooling at Hoërskool Waterkloof. Once again, McDonald was selected in the South African Schools side, this time to play a side from Italy.

In 2007, he was included in the  squad for the 2007 Vodacom Cup competition, but failed to make an appearance. He was involved at international level again though, representing South Africa at the 2007 Under 19 Rugby World Championship which was held in Ireland. He helped South Africa reach the final of the competition, where they lost 31–7 to New Zealand. Upon his return to South Africa, he once again played for the  side in the Under-19 Provincial Championship.

Blue Bulls / Varsity Cup

He also made his first class debut, playing off the bench in the ' 2008 Vodacom Cup match against  before reverting to Under-21 level for the Blue Bulls during the 2008 Under-21 Provincial Championship.

He once again played for the  side during the 2009 Under-21 Provincial Championship.

In 2010, McDonald made the move across the Jukskei River to join Johannesburg-based university side . He played Varsity Cup rugby for them during the 2010, 2011 and 2012 seasons, scoring eight tries in 22 appearances over the three seasons, but failed to break into the  team.

Griffons

He appeared in the Currie Cup competition for the first time during the 2013 Currie Cup First Division competition, making eight appearances as the Griffons finished the season in sixth position. He made two appearances in both the 2014 Vodacom Cup and the 2014 Currie Cup qualification competition before re-establishing himself in the first team during the 2014 Currie Cup First Division competition. He played the full 80 minutes of the match as the Griffons ran out 23–21 winners to win their first silverware for six years.

Shortly after the conclusion of the 2014 Currie Cup First Division, McDonald was also included in the ' wider training squad as part of their preparations for the 2015 Super Rugby season.

References

South African rugby union players
Living people
1988 births
Rugby union players from Port Elizabeth
Rugby union wings
Rugby union fullbacks
Blue Bulls players
Griffons (rugby union) players
Tshwane University of Technology alumni